Philadelphia Toboggan Coasters (PTC) is one of the oldest existing roller coaster manufacturing companies in the world. Based in Hatfield, Pennsylvania, it was established in 1904 by Henry Auchey and Chester Albright under the name Philadelphia Toboggan Company. The company manufactured carousels, wooden roller coasters, toboggans (roller coaster cars) and later, roller coaster trains.

History 
The Philadelphia Toboggan Company was incorporated January 20, 1904.
It built and designed roller coasters until 1979. Notable designers included Joe McKee, John A. Miller, Herbert Schmeck, Frank Hoover, and John C. Allen. When Allen retired as president in 1976, the company stopped designing roller coasters but continued to work on coaster projects until 1979 when it exited the coaster-construction industry permanently.

The company manufactured carousels known for their elaborate carvings and decorations.  It expanded with the acquisition of the inventory of the Dentzel Carousel Company in 1927.  Lead carvers included Daniel Carl Muller, Leo Zoller, John Zalar, and Frank Caretta. Examples of the company's carousels (manufactured 1904–1934) exist throughout the United States.

The Philadelphia Toboggan Company built the Rollo Coaster at Idlewild Park in 1938, and the carousel for the same amusement park in 1931. The company manufactured Skee Ball games from 1946-1977. In 1926, PTC was granted a trademark on a new name, Philtobco.

Flying Turns

Developed by J. Norman Bartlett and John Miller, the Flying Turns coasters came to the attention of PTC. Recognizing the ride's potential, PTC signed a licensing agreement with Bartlett and Miller to market the ride in North America—with the exception of the state of California. With the arrival of the Great Depression, PTC built only one in 1931, at Rocky Point Amusement Park. The coaster was engineered by Herbert Schmeck, but experienced problems. The ride opened late in the summer and Schmeck stayed on site for some time before he was able to get the ride operating consistently. The ride was damaged beyond repair by a storm on September 21, 1938.

Schmeck engineered a second Flying Turns for Hershey Park in August 1941. Due to the entry of the United States into World War II, and the resulting rationing of building materials, the roller coaster was never built. It would have been located in the park next to what is now the Wave Swinger, and part of where the Comet lift hill is located. Though Bartlett and Miller went on to build several more Flying Turns-type coasters, PTC never proposed another.

1990s to present

On November 27, 1991, Tom Rebbie and Bill Dauphinee purchased the Philadelphia Toboggan Company from Sam High (1934–2011), and incorporated a new company, Philadelphia Toboggan Coaster, shortly thereafter.  Rebbie was appointed president. In 2007 he bought out Dauphinee to become the sole owner, and changed the company's name to Philadelphia Toboggan Coasters, Inc. (PTCI). The company continues to manufacture roller coaster trains, queue gates and fin brakes.

List of roller coasters

As of 2019, Philadelphia Toboggan Coasters has built 127 roller coasters  around the world.

Carousels 

Most PTC carousels were numbered, so they are easily identified. Most have been moved from their original opening locations. PTC carousels that are still operating or in restoration:

Funhouse items 

Beginning before World War II, PTC was involved with the booming dark ride and funhouse business.  It spawned the company Funni-Frite Industries of Lancaster, Columbus, and (later) Pickerington, Ohio, which ceased manufacturing operations in 2000.

Laffing Sal - automated funhouse character/amusement device

See also 
 Philadelphia Toboggan Company Carousel Number 15, listed on the National Register of Historic Places in 2001.

References

External links 

 Philadelphia Toboggan Coasters, Inc.
 European Coaster Club PTC Database
 PTC Carousel 30 in Australia Homepages 
 PTC Carousel 87 at Family Kingdom Amusement Park, Myrtle Beach SC

Amusement ride manufacturers
Companies based in Montgomery County, Pennsylvania
Manufacturing companies established in 1904
Roller coaster manufacturers